Khanyisa Patricia Jaceni (born 2 October 1995), is a South African social media personality mononymously known as Khanyisa, she gained recognition through her TikTok content and later began her musical career in late 2021.

TikTok influencer with a following of more than 1.7 million and over 37 million views on TikTok with her famous catchphrase BOTTOM LINE!!, she's among the very few content creators who are verified on the platform.

She began her musical career in 2021, she was founded by the one half of JazziDisciples, Mr JazziQ, together they put out a single titled 'Ungangi Bambi'''. They went on to release what happened to be Khanyisa's breakthrough song together with Lady Du, a song titled "Bheka Mina Ngedwa", and she was labeled as the 'Amapiano rising star'.
She later released an EP in November 2021 titled 'Soft'''.

Discography

Singles and EPs

References

External links 
 

1995 births
Living people
People from Govan Mbeki Local Municipality
House musicians
Amapiano musicians 
South African songwriters
South African women singer-songwriters
Xhosa people
21st-century South African singers